Gesa Ederberg (born 1968 in Tübingen, Germany) is a German rabbi; she became the first female pulpit rabbi in Berlin in 2007 when she became the rabbi of the New Synagogue, Berlin (Oranienburger Strasse Synagogue) in the former East Berlin. Her installation as such was opposed by Berlin's senior Orthodox rabbi Yitzchak Ehrenberg.

She converted to Judaism in 1995. She was ordained by the Schechter Institute of Jewish Studies in Jerusalem in 2003. She established a Conservative Jewish beit midrash in Berlin. She was part of the 2006 founding of the European Rabbinical Assembly of Masorti/Conservative Rabbis.

As of 2013, she was the executive vice president of Masorti Europe and the rabbi of New Synagogue, Berlin.

The art exhibit “Holy Sparks”, which opened in February 2022 at the Heller Museum and the Skirball Museum, featured 24 Jewish women artists, who had each created an artwork about a female rabbi who was a first in some way. Yona Verwer created the artwork about Ederberg.

Publications

References

1968 births
Converts to Conservative Judaism
Living people
German Conservative rabbis
Conservative women rabbis
People from Tübingen